Copelatus bibulus is a species of diving beetle. It is part of the genus Copelatus in the subfamily Copelatinae of the family Dytiscidae. It was described by Félix Guignot in 1948.

References

bibulus
Beetles described in 1948